Ancona Lighthouse is a lighthouse in Ancona on the Adriatic Sea. It is placed on the hill named Colle dei Cappuccini, from which takes the name, about 119.5 metres from the old lighthouse deactivated in 1965.

Description
The old lighthouse was built for will of Pope Pius IX when the region was under the Papal States in 1860. It was a cylindrical tower in red bricks built on a quadrangular basement; it had  the focal height at  metres above sea level and emitted a white flashing light every 45 seconds.

The current lighthouse was built in 1971, it is a square base tower in concrete 15 metres high with double balcony ad lantern. The lighthouse is fully automated, operated by Marina Militare and emits four white flashes every 30 seconds visible up to 25 nautical miles.

See also
 List of lighthouses in Italy

References

External links

 Servizio Fari Marina Militare 

Lighthouses in Italy
Ancona